All German states have a  (flag of the state, sometimes known as a civil flag), that may be used by anyone. In addition to these flags, in a few states there are variants exclusively for the state senate, or for state-operated ships. In some cases, there are specific flags for high-ranking officials, mainly used as car flags. Frequently, the flags are used in vertical variants.

Current state flags

Historical flags

German Democratic Republic

Greater German Reich

Weimar Republic

Provinces of Prussia

Minority flags

See also 

Coats of arms of German states
Flags of districts of Germany
Flags of municipalities in Germany

!
Germany, states
States
States
States of Germany-related lists